NA-70 Sialkot-V is a constituency for the National Assembly of Pakistan. It mainly comprises the Sambrial Tehsil.

Members of Parliament

2018-2022: NA-76 Sialkot-V

Election 2002 

General elections were held on 10 Oct 2002. Umar Ahmad of PML-Q won by 68,468 votes and Salman Saif Cheema of PPP got 31,602 votes.

Election 2008 

General elections were held on 18 Feb 2008. Rana Abdul Sattar son of Rana Shamim Ahmed Khan of PML-N won by 92,182 votes against the president of PMLQ Ch Shujaat Hussain.

Election 2013 

General election 2013 were held on May 11, 2013. Rana Shamim Ahmed Khan won by 129,571 votes and became the member of National Assembly. He also serves as Chairman Standing committee on Interior and narcotics control.

Election 2018 
General elections were held on 25 July 2018.

See also
NA-69 Sialkot-IV
NA-71 Narowal-I

References

External links 
Election result's official website
Delimitation 2018 official website Election Commission of Pakistan

76
76